Timothy Davies (17 January 1857 – 22 August 1951) was a British Liberal Party politician). He represented Fulham as a Borough Councillor, Borough Alderman, County Councillor, Mayor and Member of Parliament.

Background
Timothy Davies was born in Llanpumsaint, Carmarthenshire where he spent his childhood years until later moving to Liverpool to become an apprentice in the textile industry. In 1885, he founded his own company in Fulham, London but maintained strong links with Wales as evidenced when he commissioned a stone fountain for Carmarthen Park in 1899.

Political career
In 1896 he was elected a member of Fulham Vestry as a Progressive. He continued as a councillor of the new Fulham Borough Council in 1900. In 1901 he was elected mayor of the borough council, serving from 1901 to 1902. In 1903 he was appointed a borough alderman. In 1901 he was elected to the London County Council as a Progressive Party candidate, gaining Fulham from the Conservative-backed Moderate party.

He was re-elected in 1904 and served until 1907.

He was a supporter of the Temperance movement. For many years he had a close friendship with David Lloyd George who had an affair with Davies's wife, Lizzie.Tempestuous Journey by Frank Owen</ref> In 1906 he completed his hat-trick of Fulham representation when he gained the parliamentary seat at the General Election;

In 1910, rather than seek re-election at Fulham, he switched constituencies to contest Louth in Lincolnshire;

Despite failure, he fought the seat again 11 months later;

In 1912 he voted against and in 1917 he voted in favour of giving votes to women. In 1916 he supported the introduction of Conscription. In 1918, he was absent during the key Maurice debate.
He sought re-election at the 1918 election but found that the Coalition 'coupon' had been issued to his Unionist opponent;

Davies did not stand for Parliament again.

As well as serving as an MP Timothy Davies also became a Justice of the Peace and an Income Tax Commissioner. He died in 1951, aged 94.

References

External links
 

1857 births
1951 deaths
Liberal Party (UK) MPs for English constituencies
Mayors of places in Greater London
Members of Fulham Metropolitan Borough Council
Members of London County Council
Progressive Party (London) politicians
UK MPs 1906–1910
UK MPs 1910–1918